Radogost may refer to: 

 Radogost (bishop) (12th century), Bosnian bishop
 Radogost (mythology), a theonym and epithet of Svarozhits
 Ardagast, or Radogost (fl. 584–597), South Slavic chieftain
 A Slavic name meaning 'guest'

See also 
 Radagast
 Radogoszcz (disambiguation)
 Radegast (disambiguation)